Alexander Arzumanyan (born 24 December 1959) is Armenia's first ambassador to the United States (from 1992–1993) and to the United Nations (from 1992–1996). He served as minister of foreign affairs from 1996 until his resignation, with President Levon Ter-Petrosyan, in 1998. Since then, he has been involved in local politics, as chairman of the Armenian national liberation movement (2000–2002), and in the private sector, as chief advisor to the president of Armagrobank (1998–2000). At present, he works with local NGOs in the area of human rights, democracy, and regional cooperation, and is a founding member of the Turkish Armenian Reconciliation Commission, an independent group of prominent Armenians and Turks. The TARC was established in July 2001 to promote mutual understanding and good will between the people of Armenia and Turkey, and to encourage improved relations between the countries. In July 2002, the TARC commissioned a groundbreaking legal analysis regarding the applicability of the United Nations Convention on the Prevention and Punishment of the Crime of Genocide to the Armenian Genocide from the New York-based International Center for Transitional Justice.

Since 2017 he is the ambassador of Armenia to Denmark in Copenhagen.

Biography 
Arzoumanian holds a BS from Peoples' Friendship University of Russia in Moscow and an MS in mathematics from Yerevan State University. He was working as a theoretical mathematician at the Yerevan Automated Control Systems Scientific Research Institute when he became involved in the independence movement in the late 1980s. He ran the information center of the Armenian national movement, and published the Movement's newspaper and other samizdat literature until Armenia became independent in 1991.

External links 
Alexander Arzoumanian Arrested, hetq.am

References 

1959 births
Diplomats from Yerevan
Armenian prisoners and detainees
Living people
Permanent Representatives of Armenia to the United Nations
Foreign ministers of Armenia
Ambassadors of Armenia to the United States
Ambassadors of Armenia to Denmark
Yerevan State University alumni